Camp Tracy may be:

 Camp Tracy (California)
 Camp Tracy (Utah)